County Wicklow was a parliamentary constituency  in Ireland, represented in the Parliament of the United Kingdom. From 1801 to 1885 it returned two Members of Parliament (MPs) to the House of Commons of the United Kingdom of Great Britain and Ireland.

At the 1885 general election, under the Redistribution of Seats Act 1885, County Wicklow was divided into two parliamentary divisions: East Wicklow and West Wicklow.

Boundaries
This constituency comprised the whole of County Wicklow.

Members of Parliament

Elections

Elections in the 1830s

Elections in the 1840s

Acton resigned by accepting the office of Steward of the Chiltern Hundreds, causing a by-election.

Elections in the 1850s

 

Wentworth-FitzWilliam succeeded to the peerage, becoming 6th Earl FitzWilliam, causing a by-election.

Proby was appointed Comptroller of the Household, requiring a by-election.

Elections in the 1860s

Elections in the 1870s

Elections in the 1880s

References

The Parliaments of England by Henry Stooks Smith (1st edition published in three volumes 1844–50), 2nd edition edited (in one volume) by F.W.S. Craig (Political Reference Publications 1973)

Historic constituencies in County Wicklow
Westminster constituencies in County Wicklow (historic)
Constituencies of the Parliament of the United Kingdom established in 1801
Constituencies of the Parliament of the United Kingdom disestablished in 1885